The Commons Act 2006 (c 26) is an Act of the Parliament of the United Kingdom. It implements recommendations contained in the Common Land Policy Statement 2002.

The Act sets out the provision for designation of town or village greens.

Part 1

Section 14
Section 14(3)(b) was substituted by paragraph 21 of Schedule 1 to the Church Property Measure 2018 (No 8).

Section 15
The words "the relevant period" were substituted for the words from "the period" to the end of section 15(3)(c) by section 14(2) of the Growth and Infrastructure Act 2013. Section 15(3A) was inserted by section 14(3) of the Growth and Infrastructure Act 2013, and consists of the definition of "the relevant period".

No land within the limits of land to be acquired or used shown on the plans certified by the Secretary of State as the land plans for the purpose of the River Mersey (Mersey Gateway Bridge) Order 2011 (SI 2011/41), or on the plans and sections certified by the Secretary of State under article 47 of the Transport for Greater Manchester (Light Rapid Transit System) (Second City Crossing) Order 2013 (SI 2013/2587) as the works and land plans for the purposes of that Order, may be the subject of an application under section 15 of the Commons Act 2006.

Section 15A
This section was inserted by section 15 of the Growth and Infrastructure Act 2013. The words "in England" in section 15(1) were repealed by section 52(2) of the Planning (Wales) Act 2015. Section 15A(8) was repealed by section 52(3) of the Planning (Wales) Act 2015.

Section 15B
This section was inserted by section 15 of the Growth and Infrastructure Act 2013.

Section 15C
This section was inserted by section 16(1) of the Growth and Infrastructure Act 2013.

The words "in England" in section 15C(1) were repealed by section 53(2)(a)(i) of the Planning (Wales) Act 2015. The words "the relevant Schedule" were substituted for the words "Schedule 1A" in section 15C(1) by section 53(2)(a)(ii) of the Planning (Wales) Act 2015. The words "set out in the relevant Schedule" were inserted after the words "the Table" in section 15C(2) by section 53(2)(b) of the Planning (Wales) Act 2015. The words "appropriate national authority" were substituted for the words "Secretary of State" in sections 15C(3) to (5) by sections 53(2)(c) and (d)(i) of the Planning (Wales) Act 2015. The words "the relevant Schedule" were substituted for the words "Schedule 1A" in section 15C(5) by section 53(2)(d)(ii) of the Planning (Wales) Act 2015.

Section 15C(9) was inserted by section 53(2)(e) of the Planning (Wales) Act 2015, and consists of the definition of "the relevant Schedule".

Section 22
This section gives effect to Schedule 2.

Section 23
Section 23(1) gives effect to Schedule 3.

Section 24
Section 24(2)(d) was repealed by section 17(a) of the Growth and Infrastructure Act 2013. Sections 24(2A) and (2B) were inserted by section 17(b) of the Growth and Infrastructure Act 2013. The words "made by the Secretary of State" in section 24(2A) were repealed by section 54(2) of the Planning (Wales) Act 2015. Section 24(2B) was repealed by section 54(3) of the Planning (Wales) Act 2015. The words "Diocesan Board of Finance for the diocese in which the land is situated" were substituted for the words "Church Commissioners" in section 24(9) by section 11 of the Church of England (Miscellaneous Provisions) Measure 2010 (No 1).

Part 2

Section 34
The words "the county court" were substituted for the words "a county court" in section 34(5) by paragraph 52 of Schedule 9 to the Crime and Courts Act 2013.

Part 3

Section 41
The words "in whose area the land is situated" in section 41(1) were repealed by paragraph 70 of Schedule 9 to the Crime and Courts Act 2013.

Section 44
Section 44(1) gives effect to Schedule 4.

Part 4

Section 46
The words "the county court" were substituted for the words "a county court" in section 46(7)(a) by paragraph 52 of Schedule 9 to the Crime and Courts Act 2013.

Section 47
Section 47(1) repeals the Commons Act 1285.

Section 48
This section repeals section 147 of the Inclosure Act 1845 and section 2 of the Gifts for Churches Act 1811, the second proviso to section 2 of the Schools Sites Act 1841 and the final proviso to section 1 of the Literary and Scientific Institutions Act 1854.

Section 49
Section 49(1) repeals section 31 of the Commons Act 1876.

Section 50
This section amends the Commons Act 1899.

Section 51
This section repeals section 68 of the Countryside and Rights of Way Act 2000.

Part 5

Section 52
This section gives effect to Schedule 5.

Section 53
This section gives effect to Schedule 6.

Section 56 - Commencement
The following orders have been made under this section:
The Commons Act 2006 (Commencement No. 1, Transitional Provisions and Savings) (England) Order 2006 (S.I. 2006/2504 (C. 84))
The Commons Act 2006 (Commencement No. 2, Transitional Provisions and Savings) (England) Order 2007 (S.I. 2007/456 (C. 17))
The Commons Act 2006 (Commencement No. 3, Transitional Provisions and Savings) (England) Order 2007 (S.I. 2007/2584 (C. 98))
The Commons Act 2006 (Commencement No. 4 and Savings) (England) Order 2008 (S.I. 2008/1960 (C. 94))
The Commons Act 2006 (Commencement No. 5) (England) Order 2010 (S.I. 2006/61 (C. 10))
The Commons Act 2006 (Commencement No. 6) (England) Order 2011 (S.I. 2011/2460 (C. 88))
The Commons Act 2006 (Commencement No. 1 and Savings (England and Wales) and Commencement No. 5 (England) (Amendment)) Order 2010 (S.I. 2010/2356 (C. 114))
The Commons Act 2006 (Commencement No. 1, Transitional Provisions and Savings) (Wales) Order 2007 (S.I. 2007/2386 (W. 197) (C. 88))

Section 59
Section 59(3A) was inserted by section 16(3)(a) of the Growth and Infrastructure Act 2013. The words "made by the Secretary of State" were inserted after the words "order under section 15C(5)" in section 59(3A) by paragraph 8(2) of Schedule 7 to the Planning (Wales) Act 2015.

The words "or (3A)" were inserted after the words "subsection (3)" in section 59(4) by section 16(3)(b) of the Growth and Infrastructure Act 2013.

Sections 59(5) and (6) were inserted by paragraph 8(3) of Schedule 7 to the Planning (Wales) Act 2015.

Section 61
The words "Welsh Ministers" were substituted for the words "National Assembly for Wales" in the definition of "appropriate national authority" in section 61(1) by paragraph 9 of Schedule 7 to the Planning (Wales) Act 2015.

Schedule 1
The words "the Natural Resources Body for Wales" were substituted for the words "the Countryside Council for Wales" in paragraphs 1(1)(c) and (2) by paragraph 434 of Schedule 2 to the Natural Resources Body for Wales (Functions) Order 2013 (SI 2013/755) (W 90).

Schedule 1A
This Schedule was inserted by section 16(2) of, and Schedule 4 to, the Growth and Infrastructure Act 2013. The title of this Schedule was substituted by section 53(3) of the Planning (Wales) Act 2015.

Paragraphs 4A and 4B in the Table were inserted by regulation 5(2) of the Housing and Planning Act 2016 (Permission in Principle etc) (Miscellaneous Amendments) (England) Regulations 2017 (SI 2017/276). Paragraphs 7A to 7D in the Table were inserted by article 3(4) of the Commons (Town and Village Greens) (Trigger and Terminating Events) Order 2014 (SI 2014/257). Paragraph 10 in the Table was inserted by article 3(5) of the Commons (Town and Village Greens) (Trigger and Terminating Events) Order 2014.

The definition of "operational development" was inserted after the definition of "the 1990 Act" under the cross-heading "Interpretation" by article 3(6) of the Commons (Town and Village Greens) (Trigger and Terminating Events) Order 2014.

Paragraphs 3 to 6 of the Notes to the Table were inserted by article 3(7) of the Commons (Town and Village Greens) (Trigger and Terminating Events) Order 2014.

Schedule 1B
This Schedule was inserted by section 53(3) of, and Schedule 6 to, the Planning (Wales) Act 2015.

Schedule 4
Paragraph 5, and the preceding cross heading, were repealed by section 52 of, and Schedule 3 to, the Church Property Measure 2018.

See also
Commons Act
 Commons Registration Act 1965
 Countryside and Rights of Way Act 2000

References
Macgregor (ed). "Commons Act 2006". Halsbury's Statutes of England and Wales. Fourth Edition. 2009 Reissue. Title "Land , Tenancies and Housing". Volume 24.

External links
The Commons Act 2006, as amended from the National Archives.   Text was copied from this source, which is available under an  Open Government Licence v3.0. © Crown copyright.
The Commons Act 2006, as originally enacted from the National Archives.   Text was copied from this source, which is available under an  Open Government Licence v3.0. © Crown copyright.
Explanatory notes to the Commons Act 2006.

United Kingdom Acts of Parliament 2006
Common land in the United Kingdom